3YE (써드아이; pronounced Third Eye) is a South Korean girl group formed by GH Entertainment in 2019. The group debuted on May 21, 2019, with the digital single "DMT".

History
Prior to the group's formation, all of the group's members were part of GH Entertainment's previous girl group Apple.B. Yuji had also participated in K-pop Star 2 and Kara Project before becoming a trainee under GH Entertainment. The trio debuted on May 21, 2019, with their first digital single, "DMT (Do Ma Thang)". Their second digital single, "OOMM (Out Of My Mind)", was released on September 17. In November, they won the Most Anticipated Idol Award at the KY Star Awards. Their third digital single, "Queen", was released on February 21, 2020, followed by their first EP, Triangle, on June 29. On July 14, they released the special summer single, "Like This Summer".

The group's fourth digital single, "Stalker", was released on April 1, 2021.

Members
 Yuji (유지)
 Yurim (유림)
 Haeun (하은)

Discography

Extended plays

Singles

Awards and nominations

References

K-pop music groups
South Korean girl groups
South Korean dance music groups
Musical groups from Seoul
Musical groups established in 2019
2019 establishments in South Korea
South Korean pop music groups